Shikrapur is a village & gram panchayat in Salarpur block, Budaun district, Uttar Pradesh, India. According to 2011 Census of India, the total village population is 1,302, out of 704 are males and 598 are females. Its village code is 128328. Budaun railway station is 6 KM away from the village.

References

Villages in Budaun district